Charuymaq-e Sharqi Rural District is in Shadian District of Charuymaq County, East Azerbaijan province, Iran. At the National Census of 2006, its population was 7,630 in 1,269 households. There were 7,443 inhabitants in 1,687 households at the following census of 2011. At the most recent census of 2016, the population of the rural district was 6,939 in 1,939 households. The largest of its 52 villages was Owrtasu, with 1,201 people.

References 

Charuymaq County

Rural Districts of East Azerbaijan Province

Populated places in East Azerbaijan Province

Populated places in Charuymaq County